WeWork: Or The Making and Breaking of a $47 Billion Unicorn is a 2021 American documentary film, written and directed by Jed Rothstein. It follows WeWork, a real estate company run by Adam Neumann, who was ultimately forced out of the company.

The film had  its world premiere at South by Southwest on March 17, 2021. It was released on April 2, 2021, by Hulu. The film won an Emmy for Outstanding Business and Economic Documentary on September 29, 2022.

Synopsis
The film follows Adam Neumann, the founder of the real estate company WeWork, who is ultimately forced out of the company after a failed IPO.

Production
In October 2020, it was announced Jed Rothstein would direct the film, with Hulu set to distribute. Campfire's Ross Dinerstein also produced alongside executive producers Rebecca Evans and Ross Girard from Campfire, Tim Lee, Michael Cho and Mimi Rode from Olive Hill Media, Travis Collins, Kyle Kramer and Randall Lane from Forbes and Danni Mynard.

Release
The film had its world premiere at South by Southwest on March 17, 2021. It was released on April 2, 2021, on Hulu.

Reception
WeWork: Or the Making and Breaking of a $47 Billion Unicorn holds a 77% approval rating on review aggregator website Rotten Tomatoes, based on 56 reviews, with a weighted average of 6.40/10. The film won an Emmy for Outstanding Business and Economic Documentary on September 28, 2022. Recipients include Executive Producers Michael Cho, Mimi Rode, Tim Lee, Travis Collins, Rebecca Evans, Ross Girard, Kyle Kramer, Randall Lane, Danni Mynard, Producer Ross M. Dinerstein, and Director Jed Rothstein. The site's critics consensus reads, "It's hard to ignore the parts that are left unexamined, but WeWork: Or the Making and Breaking of a $47 Billion Unicorn does well enough by its real-life stranger-than-fiction story."

See also 

 Billion Dollar Loser, 2020 nonfiction book about WeWork

References

External links
 

2021 films
American documentary films
2021 documentary films
Biographical documentary films
Hulu original films
Films directed by Jed Rothstein
2020s English-language films
2020s American films